Richard John Tayler  (born 12 August 1948) is a former New Zealand runner who mostly competed in distances from 1500 m to 10,000 m.

Tayler was born in Timaru in 1948. He is best known for winning the 10,000 metres at the 1974 Commonwealth Games in Christchurch, New Zealand. In the race he won in a time of 27:46.4 minutes, beating Dave Black of England by 2 seconds.

Tayler competed at the 1970 and 1974 Commonwealth Games, as well as the 1972 Summer Olympics.

He finished 12th at the 1st IAAF World Cross Country Championships in Waregem, Belgium, 1973.

Arthritis cut short Tayler's running career.

In the 2014 New Year Honours, Tayler was appointed a Member of the New Zealand Order of Merit for services to athletics.

References

External links 
 Profile at New Zealand Olympic Committee website
 

1948 births
Living people
New Zealand male long-distance runners
Athletes (track and field) at the 1970 British Commonwealth Games
Athletes (track and field) at the 1972 Summer Olympics
Athletes (track and field) at the 1974 British Commonwealth Games
Olympic athletes of New Zealand
Commonwealth Games gold medallists for New Zealand
Commonwealth Games medallists in athletics
Members of the New Zealand Order of Merit
New Zealand male cross country runners
Medallists at the 1974 British Commonwealth Games